Edgar C. Levey (August 4, 1881 – October 8, 1962) was a Republican Speaker of the California Assembly and an assistant District Attorney in San Francisco in the early 1900s.

Biography
Edgar C. Levey was born in 1881 in San Francisco, California. He graduated from Lowell High School.  He received his Bachelor's degree from the University of California, in 1903. He got his law degree from Hastings College of Law in 1905.  In 1906, he was appointed Assistant District Attorney for San Francisco under D.A. Hiram Johnson.  Levey left the D.A.'s office in 1910 to go into private practice.

Levey married Emily Newman in 1916 and raised two children: Janet Therese and Elaine Alice. He was President of the Native Sons of the Golden West and was a Master of Masons. He served 1917-1918 as Great Sachem (state president) of the Great Council of California, Improved Order of Red Men, oldest fraternal order of American origin (dating back to the Committees of Correspondence in the original Thirteen Colonies of 1765). He had been initiated into Oshonee Tribe No. 78 of San Francisco on March 31, 1909; served as Sachem (local president) in the first half of 1911. He served as the Great Incohonee (national president) of the Order 1938-1940 and presided in the latter year at Columbus, Ohio.  "His administration as Great Incohonee was distinguished by two major tasks.  The first was to establish a national magazine and the second was the creation of an Organization Department" (to extend the Order into new territories).   Upon the completion of his service on the national board he was appointed to the Great Board of Appeals (national judicial body) on which he served until his death in 1962.  In November 1924 he was first elected to the legislature to represent San Francisco's 28th Assembly District.  In the legislature, Levey chaired a committee to investigate the need for motor laws and mandatory automobile liability insurance. Levey was re-elected to his Assembly seat in 1926, 1928, 1930, and 1932.  Levey was elected the 42nd Speaker of the Assembly in 1927. He served three terms as Speaker. Levey was succeeded by Walter J. Little as Speaker in January 1933.

In 1934, Levey ran for the U.S. Congress, but lost the Republican primary for Congressional District 4. In November 1936, Levey returned to the Assembly for one term. In 1938, he ran for Senate District 14 and lost. He tried to reclaim his old Assembly seat in the reapportioned 19th Assembly District in 1944 but lost.

Levey died on October 8, 1962 at Hahnemann Hospital in San Francisco.

References

External links
Levey's election history at joincalifornia.com
Political graveyard info on Levey
Lowell High School history -Levey info

1881 births
1962 deaths
Jewish American state legislators in California
Speakers of the California State Assembly
Republican Party members of the California State Assembly
University of California, Hastings College of the Law alumni
20th-century American politicians
California lawyers
20th-century American lawyers